Waterbury Center is an unincorporated village and census-designated place (CDP) in the town of Waterbury, Washington County, Vermont, United States. As of the 2020 census, it had a population of 390.

Vermont Route 100 runs through the west side of Waterbury Center, leading south to Interstate 89 at Waterbury village and north  to Stowe. The community is bordered to the west by Waterbury Center State Park, on the east arm of Waterbury Reservoir, an impoundment on the Little River, which flows south to the Winooski River west of Waterbury village.

References 

Populated places in Washington County, Vermont
Census-designated places in Washington County, Vermont
Census-designated places in Vermont